Del Veladero is an Andean mountain in the La Rioja province of Argentina.

See also
 List of mountains in the Andes

References

Veladero